Hervey Range Developmental Road (alternate spellings: "Herveys", "Hervey's") is a continuous  road route in the Townsville and Charters Towers local government areas of Queensland, Australia. It is designated as State Route 72. It is a state-controlled regional road (number 83A).

Route description
State Route 72 continues east on Ross River Road. Here it runs under the Bruce Highway at an incomplete diamond interchange. From the start to this point the road has a four-lane divided carriageway, which reverts to two lanes undivided just west of the Bruce Highway.

After crossing Scrubby Creek and Canal Creek, passing the exit to Black River Road to the north-east, entering Hervey Range, and crossing Log Creek, the road turns south-east. It runs parallel to the Black River as it approaches the ascent of the Hervey Range.

On entering the locality of  the road turns to the west. After turning south-west it reaches an intersection with the Gregory Highway, where it ends.

The road is fully sealed.

Road widening

Ross River Road

Ross River Road is a state-controlled district road (number 612). The road's only major intersection is with Douglas–Garbutt Road.

History
The original Hervey Range Road, now known as Page Road, was a steep and difficult track. It was constructed in 1865, and was then the only way to travel from Townsville to the west.

In the period 1872 to 1899 the population grew to about 25,000. The railway opened in 1882, effectively replacing a two-day coach ride from Townsville for new arrivals.

The current Hervey's Range Road (as it was then called) was opened in April, 1933.

Major intersections
All distances are from Google Maps.

See also

 List of road routes in Queensland
 List of numbered roads in Queensland

References

Roads in Queensland